Gaushala  (Nepali: गौशाला ) is a municipality in Mahottari District in Province No. 2 of Nepal. The municipality was established on 18 May 2014 by merging existing Nigauli, Ramnagar, Gaushala VDCs. It occupies an area of 144.73 km2 with a total population of 66,673.

Gaushala Bazar is the second largest business center in the Mahottari district of Nepal. The animal market of the place is well known. Gaushala is a variation of Goshala, a Sanskrit word that means the house of Cow. There is a huge cattle pen named Gaushala containing more than 100 cows. It is protected by the government of Nepal. Ram Lakhan Chaudhary was Ex-VDC chief of Gaushala Bazar.

Everest Chemical, one of the oldest sugarcane mills in Nepal is located in this municipality. A high school, Tribhuvan Higher Secondary School, was established in 2006.

References

Populated places in Mahottari District
Nepal municipalities established in 2014
Municipalities in Madhesh Province